Wallraff is a German surname. Notable people with the surname include:

Andreas Wallraff, German quantum physicist
 (born 1963), German actor
Günter Wallraff (born 1942), German writer and undercover journalist

German-language surnames

de:Wallraff